Nasser Saleh (born 19 December 1992) is a Spanish actor. He is best known for his role as Román Lorente on the Spanish television show Física o Química. In 2010, he appeared in the Oscar nominated film Biutiful along with fellow Spanish actor Javier Bardem.

Personal life 
He was born on 19 December 1992. Saleh is of Moroccan descent and is fluent in Spanish and Arabic.

Filmography

References

External links 
  at the Internet Movie Database 
  on Kuranda 

1992 births
Living people
Spanish male film actors
Spanish male television actors
Spanish people of Moroccan descent
21st-century Spanish male actors